Mika Monto (born March 20, 1976 in Hyvinkaa) is a former professional squash player who represents Finland. He reached a career-high world ranking of World No. 45 in December 2001.

Currently he is based in Kuala Lumpur, Malaysia, working as a national coach in SRAM (Squash Racquets Association of Malaysia) and as an independent musician (troubadour).

References

External links 
 
 

Finnish male squash players
Living people
1976 births